Hedda Wardemann is an immunologist and Professor in the Division of B cell immunology at the German Cancer Research Center in Heidelberg, Germany.

Education and scientific career 
Hedda Wardemann studied Biology at the Albert-Ludwig-University in Freiburg from 1992 until 1998. In 1998 she started as a doctoral researcher at the Max-Planck-Institute for Immunobiology, where she graduated in 2001.

Wardemann moved to New York, United States, to work as a PostDoc in the laboratory of Michel C. Nussenzweig at the Rockefeller University until 2003. From 2003 to 2005, she held a position as Research Assistant Professor in Nussenzweigs group before she opened her junior research group at the Max-Planck-Institute for Infection Biology in Berlin, Germany. Since 2014 Hedda Wardemann heads the B cell immunology division at the German Cancer Research Center in Heidelberg, Germany.

References

External links 
 Division of B Cell Immunology
 Interview with Hedda Wardemann
 Hedda Wardemann

Living people
Year of birth missing (living people)
Place of birth missing (living people)
German immunologists
German medical researchers
University of Freiburg alumni
Women immunologists
Women medical researchers
German women biologists